Timothy P. Gordon is an American former politician from New York who served in the New York State Assembly for two terms. He was first elected in 2006 and was re-elected in 2008 to represent the 108th Assembly District. A member of the Independence Party, Gordon caucused with the Assembly's Democratic majority. 

Gordon's accomplishments during his tenure in the Assembly included his sponsorship of the following bills that became law: (a) renewable energy legislation that allowed net metering for businesses, government buildings, and farms. 

After having voted against same-sex marriage in 2007, Gordon voted "yes" on same-sex marriage legislation that passed the Assembly in May 2009.  

Gordon was defeated by Republican Steven McLaughlin in his 2010 bid for re-election after Gordon was filmed disposing of his opponent's lawn signs and calling an alleged constituent a "fraud".

References

Place of birth missing (living people)
Year of birth missing (living people)
Living people
People from Bethlehem, New York
Members of the New York State Assembly
State University of New York at Brockport alumni
Independence Party of New York politicians
21st-century American politicians